Hypothenemus hampei, the coffee berry borer or coffee borer beetle, is a small beetle native to Africa. It is among the most harmful pests to coffee crops across the world where coffee is cultivated. Spanish common names of the insect include barrenador del café, gorgojo del café, and broca del café.

Description
Females have two larval stages and males only one. They have strong mandibles, and their larval phase lasts 10 to 26 days. The adults are small black beetles.  Females are 1.4–1.8 mm long. The males are 1.2–1.6 mm long.  Female beetles can fly short distances; males have rudimentary wings.  H. hampei is confused sometimes with the false coffee berry borer (H. obscurus or H. seriatus) and Xylosandrus (Scolytidae), but these species do not enter the coffee bean endosperm.

Life cycle
The maturation of the insect (from egg to adult) lasts between 24 and 45 days, varying according to the weather. Usually, the female drills the berry through the central disc, although it can enter through the side walls if the fruit is dry. Two days after the access, the beetle lays 35–50 eggs, which produce 13 females for each male. The lifespan for females is 35–190 days and for males 40 days. The new insects mate inside the seed. Some females lay the eggs in the same coffee plant, others colonize new ones. The males never leave the fruit.

The same plant can host three to five generations of beetles. Up to 100 beetles can be found in a single fruit. The insect is very sensitive to desiccation, and waits for the rains to leave the fruit. The most affected areas in the crops are the shady and moist ones.

Colonisation

The main host of H. hampei is Coffea arabica, but other coffee species have been affected in some cases. The female beetles attack the fruits from 8 weeks past the flowering to 32 weeks. When the insect enters, it builds galleries in the endosperm where the eggs are deposited.

Distribution
The insect is endemic to central Africa and has now spread to most coffee-producing countries through the accidental introduction of contaminated seeds. The first report in the American continent were in Brazil (1926). In the 1970s, it affected Guatemala and Mexico. The beetle entered Colombia during the late 1980s. It entered the Dominican Republic in the 1990s. It was detected in Puerto Rico in August 2007.  It was discovered in Kona (Big Island), Hawaii in August 2010.

Genome and caffeine detoxification
The draft genome of the coffee berry borer consists of ca. 163 million base pairs (Vega et al. 2015 . Caffeine demethylase has been shown to be responsible for caffeine breakdown in the alimentary canal of the insect (Ceja-Navarro et al. 2015 .

Pest management
The presence of the insect affects the economy of over 20 million families that depend on the coffee harvest. Due to the losses in yield and quality caused by the insect, growers end up losing significant amounts of income. The main pest management strategies involve different components, including monitoring, controlled harvest, and the use of biological control agents.

Prevention
Prevention is based in the careful inspection of the coffee beans before leaving the coffee farms to avoid spreading of the insects. Also, a number of border controls has been established in countries with coffee crops.

Chemical control
Insecticides are useful only before the female beetle penetrates the berry.  Resistance to endosulfan, which has been banned in many countries, has been reported in New Caledonia.

Biological control
Biological control methods use the natural enemies of the coffee berry borer to reduce the population. Pest management through biological control can utilize predators, parasites and diseases that attack the larvae or adult beetles.

Birds
During the time when beetle offspring emerge from each commercially ruined berry to disperse, they are vulnerable to predation. The yellow warbler, rufous-capped warbler, and other insectivorous birds have been shown to reduce by 50% the number of coffee berry borers in Costa Rican coffee plantations.

Parasitoids
The parasitoids used to control the borer beetle are Hymenoptera (wasps) native to Africa. Although they have a low impact in the beetle population, the use of biological controls allows the product to qualify as organic food.
 
Bethylid parasitoids (Bethylidae): Cephalonomia stephanoderis Betrem and Prorops nasuta Waterston were introduced in some Latin American countries from Africa during the 1980s and 1990s with low success. In the late 1990s, the C. hyalinipennis native of North America was described as attacking the borer beetle in Chiapas, south of Mexico. This species preys on the eggs of H. hampei. Another useful betylid is Sclerodermus cadavericus Benoit, but its management is difficult, since it is an aggressive wasp and can cause severe dermatitis.
'Eulophid parasitoids (Eulophidae): Phymastichus coffea was discovered in Togo in 1987. It attacks the adult beetle, and mass-rearing in Colombia has been successful. It has a capacity to stay in the coffee crops for a long time.
Braconid parasitoids (Braconidae): Heterospilus coffeicola Schmiedeknecht was observed in Uganda, but its reproduction in laboratories has been unsuccessful.

Insect predators
Ants (Hymenoptera: Formicidae) have been reported as predators of H. hamper but they do not control the insect. Research at the Centro Nacional de Investigaciones de Café (Cenicafé, Colombia) reported other insect families as predators: Anthocoridae (Hemiptera) and Cucujidae (Coleoptera). The following are the genus and species that have been reported to attack the borer beetle:

Formicidae: Solenopsis, Pheidole, Wasmannia, Paratrechina, Crematogaster, Brachymyrmex and Prenolepis
Anthocoridae: Calliodes and Scoloposcelis
Cucujidae: Cathartus quadricollis (Guérin-Méneville)

Nematodes
Metaparasitylenchus hypothenemi (Nematoda: Allantonematidae) has been reported in Mexico.  A Panagrolaimus sp. has been reported in the field in India.  In laboratory experiments, Heterorhabditis sp. and Steinernema feltiae have been shown to infect the insect.

Fungal entomopathogens
Beauveria bassiana infection causes high mortality of the insect and products have been developed in Colombia and elsewhere. Other fungi recorded to attack CBB include: Hirsutella eleutheratorum, Isaria sp. (previously placed in the genus Paecilomyces),  and Metarhizium sp.

References

Further reading
Barrera JF, Parra M El café en Chiapas y la investigación en Ecosur. Ecosur pp. 6 (formerly available as http://www.ecosur.mx/Difusi%F3n/ecofronteras/ecofrontera/ecofront12/cafe%20en%20chiapas.pdf)
Borbón, O (1991) La broca del fruto del cafeto: programa cooperativo ICAFE-MAG. ICAFE. San José, Costa Rica. 50 pp
Bustillo AE, Cardenas R, Posada FJ (2002) Natural enemies and competitors of Hypothenemus hampei (Ferrari) (Coleoptera: Scolytidae) in Colombia. Neotrop Entomol 31:635-639 available
Camilo JE, Olivares FF, Jiménez HA (2003) Fenología de la broca del café (Hypothenemus hampei Ferrari) durante el desarrollo del fruto. Agronomía Mesoamericana 14: 59-63 available
Ceja-Navarro JA, Vega FE, Karaoz U, Hao S, Jenkins S, Lim HC, Kosina P, Infante F, Northen TR, Brodie EL (2015) Gut microbiota mediate caffeine detoxification in the primary insect pest of coffee. Nature Communications 6:7618. 
Corbett, GH (1933) Some preliminary observations on the coffee berry beetle borer, Stephanoderes (Cryphalus) hampei Ferr. J Malayan Agric 21:8-22.
Jaramillo J, Borgemeister C, Baker P (2006) Coffee berry borer Hypothenemus hampei (Coleoptera: Curculionidae): searching for sustainable control strategies. Bulletin of Entomological Research 96:223-233.
Rojas MG, Morales-Ramos JA, Harrington TC (1999) Association between Hypothenemus hampei (Coleoptera : Scolytidae) and Fusarium solani (Moniliales : Tuberculariaceae). Ann Entomol Soc Am 92:98-100 available
Vega FE, Brown SM, Chen H, Shen E, Nair MB, Ceja-Navarro JA, Brodie EL, Infante F, Dowd PF, Pain A (2015) Draft genome of the most devastating insect pest of coffee worldwide: the coffee berry borer: Hypothenemus hampei. Scientific Reports 5:12525. 

Scolytinae
Beetles of Africa
Agricultural pest insects
Woodboring beetles
Agriculture in Colombia
Beetles described in 1867